The  is a railway company in Yokkaichi, Mie, Japan. The company operates the Utsube Line and the Hachiōji Line in Yokkaichi. Both lines are  gauge railways.

The company took over the control of the lines and started the operation on April 1, 2015. Until the day before, the lines were operated by Kintetsu Railway, a major private railway operator, as branches of the Kintetsu Nagoya Line.

Seventy-five percent of the share of the company is owned by Kintetsu and the remainder is owned by the Yokkaichi city government.

References

External links

 

Rail transport in Mie Prefecture
Railway companies of Japan
Kintetsu Railway
Railway companies established in 2015
2015 establishments in Japan
Companies based in Mie Prefecture
750 V DC railway electrification